Tataháza (Croatian: Tataza) is a  village in Bács-Kiskun county, in the Southern Great Plain region of southern Hungary.

Geography

Demography 
Magyars and small community of Croats.

External links 
  Tataháza hivatalos oldala
  Hrvatski glasnik 33/2006.  Ljetna plesna škola u Aljmašu

Populated places in Bács-Kiskun County